Group C of the 2000 Fed Cup Europe/Africa Zone Group II was one of four pools in the Europe/Africa zone of the 2000 Fed Cup. Five teams competed in a round robin competition, with the top team advancing to Group I for 2001.

Yugoslavia vs. Georgia

Lithuania vs. Armenia

Egypt vs. Cyprus

Yugoslavia vs. Cyprus

Georgia vs. Armenia

Lithuania vs. Egypt

Yugoslavia vs. Armenia

Georgia vs. Egypt

Lithuania vs. Cyprus

Yugoslavia vs. Lithuania

Georgia vs. Cyprus

Egypt vs. Armenia

Georgia vs. Lithuania

Armenia vs. Cyprus

  placed first in this group and thus advanced to Group I for 2001, where they placed second in their pool of four.

See also
Fed Cup structure

References

External links
 Fed Cup website

2000 Fed Cup Europe/Africa Zone